The discography of Rag'n'Bone Man, an English singer-songwriter, consists of two studio albums, five extended plays and seventeen singles.

Studio albums

Extended plays

Singles

As lead artist

As featured artist

Promotional singles

Other charted songs

Guest appearances

Songwriting discography

References

Notes

Sources

Discographies of British artists